Vishvamitri railway station is a railway station on the Western Railway network in the state of Gujarat, India. Passenger, MEMU, and few Express/Superfast trains halt at Vishvamitri railway station.

Trains 

Following Express/Superfast trains halt at Vishvamitri railway station in both directions:

 19215/16 Saurashtra Express
 22929/30 Bhilad–Vadodara Superfast Express
 19115/16 Sayajinagari Express
 12927 Vadodara Express

See also
 Vadodara district

References

Railway stations in Vadodara district
Vadodara railway division